The Al-Atassi Mosque is a mosque in Homs, Syria.
It is situated in a public park on the site of a former graveyard at the foot of the mound on which the remains of the citadel stand. The mosque is named after Hashim al-Atassi, three-time Syrian President from the Al-Atassi family, a prominent landowning and politically active family from Homs.

References

External links
  Al-Atassi mosque

Architecture in Syria
Mosques in Homs